Nick Buchanan can refer to:

 Nick Buchanan (English cricketer) (born 1990), English cricketer
 Nick Buchanan (Australian cricketer) (born 1991), Australian cricketer